The commercialization of copylefted works differs from proprietary works. The economic focus tends to be on the commercialization of other scarcities, and complimentary goods rather than the free works themselves. One way to make money with copylefted works is to sell consultancy and support to the users of the work. Generally, financial profit is expected to be much lower in a business model utilising copyleft works only than in a business using proprietary works. Another way is to use the copylefted work as a commodity tool or component to provide a service or product. Android phones, for example, include the Linux kernel, which is copylefted. Unlike business models which commercialize copylefted works only, businesses which deal with proprietary products can make money by exclusive sales, single and transferable ownership, and litigation rights over the work, although some view these methods as monopolistic and unethical, such as those in the Free Software Movement and the Free Culture Movement.

Internal use
Businesses and governments can obtain value and cut costs by using copyleft software internally. See for example Linux adoption.

Development

By building on existing free software, businesses can reduce their development costs.  With software that is copyleft, the business will then have the disadvantage that selling licences is rarely possible (because anyone can distribute copies at no financial cost), but the business will have the advantage that their competitors can't incorporate that improved version into a product and then distribute it without that competitor also making the modifications they authored available to the original distributor, thereby avoiding a type of free-rider problem.

Copyleft enables volunteer programmers and organizations to feel involved and contribute to software and feel confident any future derivatives will remain accessible to them, and that their contributions are part of a larger goal, like developing the kernel of an operating system (OS). Copylefting software makes clear the intent of never abusing or hiding any knowledge that is contributed. Copyleft also ensures that all contributing programmers and companies cannot fork proprietary versions, thereby gaining a commercial advantage over another.

Some argue the investments in research and development for business models utilising copylefted works are weak, by not having exclusivity over the profits gained from the result. Economically, copyleft is considered the only mechanism able to compete with monopolistic firms that rely on the financial exploitation of copyright, trademark and patent laws.

Distribution
Commercial distributors of Linux distributions (like Red Hat and Mandriva) might have had some ups and downs in finding a successful construction (or business model) for setting up such businesses, but in time it was shown to be possible to base a business on a commercial service surrounding a copylefted work.

One well-known example is Mandrake, which was one of the first companies to succeed on the stock market after the implosion of large parts of the IT market in the early 21st century. They also had success in convincing government bodies to switch to Mandriva, a Linux distribution they developed and maintained. Mandriva filed for administrative receivership in early 2015, and was liquidated on May 22, 2015. The Mandriva Linux distribution continues to survive as OpenMandriva Lx. Notable forks include Mageia Linux and ROSA Linux.

However, excluding some notable exceptions like the operating systems endorsed by the Free Software Foundation as compliant with the GNU FSDG (Free System Distribution Guidelines), most Linux distribution projects don't actively seek to limit the amount of proprietary software they distribute, or restrict the proliferation of non-free licenses in connection with the distributions the develop and maintain. There appears to be no real reason why the exploitation of commercial services surrounding copylefted works would not be possible in small-scale business, which as a business concept is no more complex than making money with a recipe for brewing coffee (e.g. recipes are not covered by copyright in the USA)—successfully exploited by many cafeteria owners.

There are few examples so far of small and medium-sized enterprises having risked such a leap for their core business. UserLinux, a project set up by Bruce Perens, supported the emergence of such small-scale business based on free software, that is, copylefted or otherwise freely licensed computer programs. The UserLinux website showcased some case studies and success stories of such businesses. However, as Canonical Ltd. and Ubuntu gained popularity, the UserLinux project never shipped any software and was ultimately abandoned.

Art
Providing commercial services for an artistic copylefted work is more difficult to do in practice than in software development. Public performances could be considered as one of a few possibilities of providing such services.

The music industry objected to peer-to-peer file exchanging software, but the Electronic Frontier Foundation (EFF) gave some suggestions to resolve the issue.

Objectors to the concept of proprietary published works believe that the comparison between published works and material property is misleading. Giving someone a physical object results in lost possession and control of that thing and can require asking for something in return, payment or barter, in contrast to when someone gives an idea to someone, they lose nothing, and need not ask for anything in return.

Often copylefted artistic works can be seen to have a (supporting) publicity function, promoting other works, which may or may not be proprietary, by the same artist(s). Artists sticking to an uncompromising copylefting of the whole of their artistic output, could, in addition to services and consultancy, revert to some sort of patronage (sometimes considered as limiting artistic freedom), or to other sources of income, not related to their artistic production (and so mostly limiting the time they can devote to artistic creation too). The least that can be said is that copylefting in art tends toward keeping the art thus produced as much as possible out of the commercial arena—which is considered as an intrinsic positive goal by some.

Some artists, such as Girl Talk and Nine Inch Nails, use copyleft licenses such as the Creative Commons Attribution-NonCommercial-ShareAlike license that don't allow commercial use. In this way they can choose to sell the works they invented without having to compete with others selling copies of the same works. However, some argue that the Attribution-NonCommercialShareAlike license is not a true copyleft, as it does not preserve freedom for the users of the work, as the noncommercial restriction renders the work proprietary.

Where copylefted art has a large audience of modest means or a small audience of considerable wealth, the act of releasing the art may be offered for sale. See Street Performer Protocol. This approach can be used for the release of new works, or can be used to relicense propriertary works as copylefted works, e.g. Blender.

See also
 Business models for open-source software
 Open-source economics
 Commons-based peer production

References

Copyright law
Copyleft
Economics of intellectual property